George Michael (1963–2016) was an English singer, songwriter, and record producer.

George Michael may also refer to:

 George Michael (computational physicist) (1926–2008), computational physicist
 George Michael (professor) (born 1961), political scientist
 George Michael (sportscaster) (1939–2009), American radio disk jockey, and TV host
 George Michael Bluth, a fictional character on the sitcom Arrested Development

See also
 
 
 Michael George (disambiguation)
 George M. Michaels (1910–1992) American politician
 Georges Michel (disambiguation)